The Baydar or Baydari valley sprawls for 16 km north-east in the Balaklava Raion of Sevastopol, Crimea. It is the source of the Chorna river and the location of the Chorna River Reservoir, Sevastopol's largest body of fresh water. Prehistoric menhir-statues still dot the landscape. A highway from Yalta to Sevastopol traverses the dale. The Baydar Pass connects the valley to the Black Sea coast. Most of the valley is protected as a national zakaznik, called the Baydar Nature Reserve.

External links 
 

Landforms of Sevastopol
River valleys of Europe